The House at 7066 Lobdell Road is a single-family home located in Linden, Michigan. It was listed on the National Register of Historic Places in 1982.

This house is a Greek Revival structure whose unique design and fine craftsmanship make it an outstanding example of its architectural type. It is a frame structure in an L-shaped plan. The front facade has detailed corner pilasters and is topped with a fully pedimented gable and a wide frieze. A recessed porch fronts the wing of the house, and contains two entrances.

References

		
National Register of Historic Places in Genesee County, Michigan
Greek Revival architecture in Michigan